"What Did I Do?" is a song by Kele Okereke, released as the first single from his EP The Hunter. The song's music video was released on 13 September 2011, with the song being released as a digital single in Japan 10 days later. The song features vocals from singer Lucy Taylor. The single was produced by constant collaborator XXXChange and mixed by Sub Focus.

The single's cover is the same as the cover for The Hunter EP.

On 16 November 2011, Liberator Music released a remix of the single by All The Lights to the Australian iTunes Store.

On Boxing Day 2011, a remix by Sander van Doorn was released to Beatport, released on Doorn Records. The single is billed to Kele vs. Sander van Doorn featuring Lucy Taylor. A music video (simply a re-edited version of the original video) was released.

Music video
The song's music video was released on 13 September 2011 to Kele's official YouTube channel. As of 23 November 2011, the video has 295939 views.

The music video was directed by Nova Dando, with the dancers styled by Nadine Artois.

Track listings

Charts

References

2011 singles
Kele Okereke songs
Songs written by Kele Okereke
2011 songs
Wichita Recordings singles